Calophyllum robustum is a species of flowering plant in the Calophyllaceae family. It is found only in Papua New Guinea. It is threatened by habitat loss.

References

Flora of Papua New Guinea
Vulnerable plants
robustum
Taxonomy articles created by Polbot